Tring-a-Ling is an album by American pianist Joanne Brackeen recorded in 1977 and released by the Choice label before being rereleased on CD by Candid in 2009.

Reception 

AllMusic reviewer Scott Yanow stated "The pianist's music is complex and quite tricky, but more accessible than expected due to the close interplay between the superb musicians and the variety of rhythms utilized. Open-minded listeners are advised to check this one out".

Track listing 
All compositions by Joanne Brackeen.

 "Shadowbrook-Aire" – 12:12
 "Fi-Fi's Rock" – 4:38
 "Echoes" – 9:13
 "Haiti-B" – 12:42
 "New True Illusions" – 6:00
 "Tring-a-Ling" – 6:36
 "New True Illusions" [alternate take] – 6:10  Bounus track on CD release

Personnel 
Joanne Brackeen – piano
Michael Brecker – tenor saxophone (tracks 1, 4, 6 & 7)
Clint Houston (tracks 2, 3 & 5), Cecil McBee (tracks 1, 4, 6 & 7) – bass
Billy Hart – drums

References 

Joanne Brackeen albums
1978 albums
Candid Records albums